Kim Hyun-ki (born February 9, 1983) is a South Korean ski jumper who has competed from 1998 to 2018.

Competing in four Winter Olympics, he earned his best finish of eighth in the team large hill event at Salt Lake City in 2002 while his best individual finish was 31st in the individual large hill event at those same games.

Kim's best finish at the FIS Nordic World Ski Championships was tenth in the team normal hill event at Oberstdorf in 2005 while his best individual finish was 38th in the individual normal hill at those same games. He finished 30th in the individual event of the FIS Ski-Flying World Championships 2006 in Kulm.

Kim's best individual World Cup finish was 21st in a large hill event in Japan in 2006. He has two individual victories in lesser events from 2009.

He holds a negative record for the highest number of fallouts in qualifications in World Cup with 118 fallouts.

External links

 (1998–2014 Olympic results)
 (2014 Olympic results)

 

1983 births
Living people
Olympic ski jumpers of South Korea
Ski jumpers at the 1998 Winter Olympics
Ski jumpers at the 2002 Winter Olympics
Ski jumpers at the 2006 Winter Olympics
Ski jumpers at the 2010 Winter Olympics
Ski jumpers at the 2014 Winter Olympics
Ski jumpers at the 2018 Winter Olympics
South Korean male ski jumpers
Asian Games medalists in ski jumping
Ski jumpers at the 2003 Asian Winter Games
Ski jumpers at the 2011 Asian Winter Games
Ski jumpers at the 2017 Asian Winter Games
People from Gangneung
Asian Games gold medalists for South Korea
Asian Games bronze medalists for South Korea
Medalists at the 2003 Asian Winter Games
Medalists at the 2011 Asian Winter Games
Medalists at the 2017 Asian Winter Games
Sportspeople from Gangwon Province, South Korea